Boris Turčák (born 21 February 1993) is a Slovak footballer who plays as midfielder, who currently for FC Košice.

References

External links
ŠK Slovan Bratislava profile

Talenty-info profile

1993 births
Living people
People from Čadca
Sportspeople from the Žilina Region
Slovak footballers
Slovak expatriate footballers
Slovakia youth international footballers
Association football forwards
ŠK Slovan Bratislava players
ŠK Senec players
FC Nitra players
MFK Ružomberok players
FC Universitatea Cluj players
FK Pohronie players
FC Petržalka players
FK Senica players
FC Košice (2018) players
Slovak Super Liga players
2. Liga (Slovakia) players
3. Liga (Slovakia) players
Liga II players
Expatriate footballers in Romania
Slovak expatriate sportspeople in Romania